The Faculty of Sport and Exercise Medicine (UK) (FSEM) is a not-for-profit professional organisation responsible for training, educating and representing over 500 doctors in the United Kingdom. These doctors practise in the speciality of sport and exercise medicine (SEM). The FSEM is housed in the Royal College of Surgeons Edinburgh, but is an intercollegiate faculty of the Royal Colleges of Physicians and RCSEd

SEM practice in the United Kingdom
Sport and exercise medicine is a speciality area of medicine. In the UK, the status of SEM is of a stand-alone speciality with FSEM (UK) being the specialist body administering training and education.  SEM physicians are able to prescribe drugs, perform minor surgical procedures, use diagnostic ultrasound and order other radiological imaging and blood tests, as well as providing exercise prescriptions for injury and disease.

History
In 1998, the Intercollegiate Academic Board of Sport and Exercise Medicine (IABSEM) was formed under the auspices of the Academy of Medical Royal Colleges. In 2001, the Department of Health produced a document, "Developing specialties in medicine", to be used as a template for the formation of new specialities. In 2004, an application was submitted and it was approved by the Department of Health in February 2005.

In 2006, the Faculty of Sport and Exercise Medicine (UK) was established. The successful bid for the 2012 London Olympics was seen as a very helpful event in establishing the faculty and the specialty in the UK.

The FSEM (UK) also publishes position statements.

Past presidents
Dr John Etherington
Dr Paul D Jackson
Dr Roderick D Jaques
Prof Mark E Batt
Prof Charles S B Galasko

See also

 FIMS
 British Association of Sport and Exercise Medicine
 Exercise is Medicine
 Australasian College of Sport and Exercise Physicians
 Canadian Academy of Sport and Exercise Medicine

References 

Science and technology in Edinburgh
Sports medicine in the United Kingdom
Sports medicine organizations
Medical and health organisations based in Scotland